Chad is a fictional character from Saturday Night Live, portrayed by Pete Davidson.

Background 
The character was created by and is played by Pete Davidson. He first appears in the SNL skit "Pool Boy," which is part of the episode that aired on April 16, 2016. He has no known last name.

The name Chad has been used during the last couple of decades as slang for a range of male stereotypes, which the SNL character plays on ironically.

Personality 
Chad is an easily-distracted, chill, apathetic man. In the sketch "Pool Boy," it's stated that he's 23. The sketches depict him doing various things such as going to a Narnia-like world through his closet, being targeted by a serial killer, going to a haunted mansion, touring with RuPaul, and going on a SpaceX mission. He is oblivious to the things that are about to happen to him, and usually just responds with "OK" or "cool." He is usually well-liked by other characters, and even unintentionally saves the world in his SpaceX skit.

Reception 
Chad was generally well-received by different sources. Entertainment Tonight described the character as "hilariously stupid," and Rolling Stone described him as a "stereotypical stoner bro".

References 

Saturday Night Live characters